Mark Allen Lofthouse (born April 21, 1957) is a Canadian former professional ice hockey right winger.

Drafted in 1977 by both the Washington Capitals of the National Hockey League and the Winnipeg Jets of the World Hockey Association, Lofthouse also played 40 games for the Detroit Red Wings.

Lofthouse suited up for the Capitals again on December 31, 2010 for an alumni game against the Pittsburgh Penguins. The game was held on Heinz Field on the day before the NHL Winter Classic and Lofthouse scored in the first period, tying the game.

Career statistics

Awards
 WCHL Second All-Star Team – 1977

References

External links

Profile at hockeydraftcentral.com
www.marklofthouse.com

1957 births
Living people
Adirondack Red Wings players
Canadian ice hockey right wingers
Detroit Red Wings players
Hershey Bears players
Kelowna Buckaroos players
New Haven Nighthawks players
New Westminster Bruins players
Salt Lake Golden Eagles (CHL) players
Sportspeople from New Westminster
Washington Capitals draft picks
Washington Capitals players
Winnipeg Jets (WHA) draft picks
ZSC Lions players
Ice hockey people from British Columbia